Sidi Ouriache is a commune in Aïn Témouchent Province,  north-western Algeria.

References 

Communes of Aïn Témouchent Province
Cities in Algeria
Algeria